The  was a movie theater in the Tameike section of Akasaka in Tokyo, Japan. It existed from the mid–1910s as a high-class foreign film theater, featuring benshi such as Musei Tokugawa. 

After the Great Kanto earthquake, it re-opened in October 1924 with a new, modern design created by prominent avant-garde artists. Seisaku Yoshikawa was in charge of architectural design, Yasuji Ogishima did the sculptural reliefs on the front of the building, and Tomoyoshi Murayama designed the interior. Murayama also did the cover illustrations for the theater's pamphlets in the first few years.

Film scholars such as Kenji Iwamoto have noted this theater's significance in Japanese cinematic modernism of the 1920s and 1930s.

References

External links
 Akasaka Aoikan The Aoikan pamphlet Aoi Weekly (in Japanese)

Theatres completed in 1913
Buildings and structures demolished in 1923
Theatres completed in 1924
Buildings and structures demolished in 1931
1913 establishments in Japan
1931 disestablishments in Japan
Former cinemas
Cinemas in Tokyo
Buildings and structures in Minato, Tokyo
Nikkatsu
Akasaka, Tokyo